Minister of Economy and Finance is the person in charge of the Ministry of Economy and Finance of Madagascar.

Ministers responsible for Finance
Paul Longuet, October 1960 - January 1963
Victor Miadana, January 1963 - May 1972
Albert Marie Ramaroson, May 1972 - February 1975
Désiré Rakotoarijaona, February 1975 - June 1975
Rakotovao Razakaboana, June 1975 - January 1982
Pascal Rakotomavo, January 1982 - 1989
Léon Rajaobelina, 1989 - March 1992
Gérard Rabehevitra, March 1992 - May 1992
Evariste Marson, May 1992 - October 1993
José Yvon Raserijaona, October 1993 - February 1997
Tantely Andrianarivo, February 1997 - July 1998
Tantely Andrianarivo, August 1998 - February 2002
Benjamin Andriamparany Radavidson, February 2002 - October 2007
Haja Nirina Razafinjatovo, October 2007 - March 2009
Benja Razafimahaleo, March 2009 - September 2009
Hery Rajaonarimampianina, 2009 - 2013
Lantoniaina Rasoloelison, 2013-2014
Jean Razafindravonona, 2014-2015
Gervais Rakotoarimanana, 2015-2017
Vonintsalama Andriambololona, 2017-2019
Richard Randriamandranto, 2019-2021
Rindra Rabarinirinarison, 2021-

See also
 Government of Madagascar
 Economy of Madagascar

External links
 Website of the Ministry of Economy and Finance

References

Finance
Finance Ministers
Politicians

1960 establishments in Madagascar